Jill Craybas and Julia Görges were the defending champions but chose not to participate.
Sandra Klemenschits and Andreja Klepač won the title, defeating Kristina Barrois and Eleni Daniilidou in the final, 6–1, 6–4.

Seeds

Draw

Draw

References
 Main Draw

Gastein Ladies - Doubles
2013 Doubles
Gast
Gast